The Imes Bridge is a wooden covered bridge in Madison County, Iowa. Built in 1870, it was originally located over the Middle River. In 1887 it was moved to a spot over Clinton Creek, and in 1977 was moved again to its present site. It was renovated in 1997 for a cost of $31,807.

See also
List of bridges documented by the Historic American Engineering Record in Iowa
List of covered bridges in Madison County, Iowa

References

External links

Bridges completed in 1870
Covered bridges on the National Register of Historic Places in Iowa
Bridges in Madison County, Iowa
Tourist attractions in Madison County, Iowa
Road bridges in Iowa
1870 establishments in Iowa
Relocated buildings and structures in Iowa
Historic American Engineering Record in Iowa
National Register of Historic Places in Madison County, Iowa
Wooden bridges in Iowa